Gregurovec may refer to several villages in Croatia:

Gregurovec, Krapinske Toplice in the Krapina-Zagorje County
Gregurovec, Mihovljan in the Krapina-Zagorje County
Gregurovec, Sveti Petar Orehovec in the Koprivnica-Križevci County